Nabinagar Super Thermal Power Project is a coal-based thermal power plant located at Sivanpur village in Nabinagar taluk in Aurangabad district, Bihar. It was conceptualised in 1989 by the then Chief Minister of Bihar Satyendra Narayan Sinha who sent the  proposal to set up a NTPC's super thermal power project at Nabinagar in Bihar's Aurangabad district to then Prime Minister of India Rajiv Gandhi; but the project went into limbo as the following state governments failed to follow it. In 2007, Manmohan Singh's government finally put a stamp of approval on it.

The power plant is owned by the Nabinagar Power Generating Company- initially a 50:50 joint venture between NTPC Limited and Bihar State Power Holding Company Limited. The Nabinagar plant will have capacity of 4380 MW( 660MW X 6). The project's generation capacity initially was to be 3960 MW but in 2016, the production capacity was increased to 4380 MW. Nabinagar Super Thermal Power Project will be third largest power project in India, after 4700 MW Vindhyachal Thermal Power Station (Singrauli) and maharashtra belar.

This Super Thermal Power Project is spread over 2970 acres, which includes  150 acre of land for the township and 63 acres of land for construction of rail corridor. On 17 April 2018, Bihar state cabinet, headed by chief minister Nitish Kumar,  gave its nod to handing over of Nabinagar Power Generating Company to National Thermal Power Corporation. On 15 May 2018, Bihar Government signed a memorandum of understanding (MoU) to hand over the thermal plant to National Thermal Power Corporation for a 33- years lease. For the Nabinagar plant's Bihar would get 78% of the electricity generated from the plant, while UP would get 11%, jharkhand 3% and Sikkim 1%.

Capacity
The planned capacity of the power plant in 1980 MW (3x660 MW). Unit-1 with  capacity to generate 660MW, is scheduled to be commissioned in Dec'18.

Future expansion
There is a plan to add three units of 800 MW each at the site in future.

See also

 Ultra Mega Power Projects
 Bihar State Power Holding Company Limited
 Nabinagar Thermal Power Project

References

External links
 Nabinagar Super Thermal Project at SourceWatch

Coal-fired power stations in Bihar
Aurangabad district, Bihar
Son River basin
Companies based in Bihar
Companies based in Aurangabad
Energy infrastructure completed in 2019
2019 establishments in Bihar